The three hares (or three rabbits) is a circular motif appearing in sacred sites from East Asia, the Middle East and to the churches of Devon, England (as the "Tinners' Rabbits"), and historical synagogues in Europe. It is used as an architectural ornament, a religious symbol, and in other modern works of art or a logo for adornment (including tattoos), jewelry, and a coat of arms on an escutcheon. It is viewed as a puzzle, a topology problem or a visual challenge, and has been rendered as sculpture, drawing, and painting.

The symbol features three hares or rabbits chasing each other in a circle. Like the triskelion, the triquetra, and their antecedents (e.g., the triple spiral), the symbol of the three hares has a threefold rotational symmetry. Each of the ears is shared by two hares, so that only three ears are shown. Although its meaning is apparently not explained in contemporary written sources from any of the medieval cultures where it is found, it is thought to have a range of symbolic or mystical associations with fertility and the lunar cycle. When used in Christian churches, it is presumed to be a symbol of the Trinity. Its origins and original significance are uncertain, as are the reasons why it appears in such diverse locations.

Origins in Buddhism and diffusion on the Silk Road

The earliest occurrences appear to be in cave temples in China, dated to the Sui dynasty (6th to 7th centuries). The iconography spread along the Silk Road, and was a symbol associated with Buddhism. In other contexts the metaphor has been given different meaning. For example, Guan Youhui, a retired researcher from the Dunhuang Academy, who spent 50 years studying the decorative patterns in the Mogao Caves, believes the three rabbits—"like many images in Chinese folk art that carry auspicious symbolism—represent peace and tranquility". See Aurel Stein. The hares have appeared in Lotus motifs.

The three hares appear on 13th century Mongol metalwork, and on a copper coin, found in Iran, dated to 1281.

Another appears on an ancient Islamic-made reliquary from southern Russia. Another 13th or early 14th century box, later used as a reliquary, was made in Iran under Mongol rule, and is preserved in the treasury of the Cathedral of Trier in Germany. On its base, the casket has Islamic designs, and originally featured two images of the three hares. One was lost through damage.

One theory pertaining to the spread of the motif is that it was transported from China across Asia and as far as the south west of England by merchants travelling the Silk Road and that the motif was transported via designs found on expensive Oriental ceramics. This view is supported by the early date of the surviving occurrences in China. However, the majority of representations of the three hares in churches occur in England and northern Germany. This supports a contrary view that the three hares occurred independently as English or early German symbols.

Some claim that the Devon name, Tinners' Rabbits, is related to local tin miners adopting it. The mines generated wealth in the region and funded the building and repair of many local churches, and thus the symbol may have been used as a sign of the miners' patronage. The architectural ornament of the three hares also occurs in churches that are unrelated to the miners of South West England. Other occurrences in England include floor tiles at Chester Cathedral, stained glass at Long Melford, Suffolk and a ceiling in Scarborough, Yorkshire.

In Western Europe

The motif of the three hares is used in a number of medieval or more recent European churches, particularly in France (e.g., in the Basilica of Notre-Dame de Fourvière in Lyon) and Germany. It occurs with the greatest frequency in the churches of Devon, England, where it appears to be a recollection of earlier Insular Celtic design such as the triaxially symmetric triskele and other Romano-British designs which are known from early British 'Celtic' (La Tène) metalwork such as circular enamelled and openwork triskel brooches (fibulae). The motif appears in illuminated manuscripts amongst similar devices such as the anthropomorphic "beard pullers" seen in manuscripts such as the Book of Kells, architectural wood carving, stone carving, window tracery and stained glass. In South Western England there are over thirty recorded examples of the three hares appearing on 'roof bosses' (carved wooden knobs) on the ceilings in medieval churches in Devon, (particularly Dartmoor). There is a good example of a roof boss of the three hares at Widecombe-in-the-Moor, Dartmoor, with another in the town of Tavistock on the edge of the moor. The motif occurs with similar central placement in Synagogues. Another occurrence is on the ossuary that by tradition contained the bones of St. Lazarus.

Where it occurs in England, the three hares motif usually appears in a prominent place in the church, such as the central rib of the chancel roof, or on a central rib of the nave. This suggests that the symbol held significance to the church, and casts doubt on the theory that they may have been a masons' or carpenters' signature marks. There are two possible and perhaps concurrent reasons why the three hares may have found popularity as a symbol within the church. Firstly, it was widely believed that the hare was hermaphrodite and could reproduce without loss of virginity. This led to an association with the Virgin Mary, with hares sometimes occurring in illuminated manuscripts and Northern European paintings of the Virgin and Christ Child. The other Christian association may have been with the Holy Trinity, representing the "One in Three and Three in One" of which the triangle or three interlocking shapes such as rings are common symbols. In many locations the three hares are positioned adjacent to the Green Man, a symbol commonly believed to be associated with the continuance of Anglo-Saxon or Celtic paganism. These juxtapositions may have been created to imply the contrast of the Divine with man's sinful, earthly nature.

In Judaism
Although rabbits are listed as a non-kosher animal in the Biblethey at least arguably chew their cud lacking cloven hoovesrabbits can carry very positive symbolic connotations, like lions and eagles. 16th century German scholar Rabbi Yosef Hayim Yerushalmi, saw the rabbits as a symbol of the Jewish diaspora. The replica of the Chodorow Synagogue from Poland (on display at the Museum of the Jewish Diaspora in Tel Aviv) has a ceiling with a large central painting which depicts a double-headed eagle holds two brown rabbits in its claws without harming them. The painting is surrounded by a citation from the end of Deuteronomy:

This may be translated: "As an eagle that stirreth up her nest, hovereth over her young, spreadeth abroad her wings, taketh them, beareth them on her pinions (...thus is God to the Jewish people)."

The hare frequently appears in the form of the symbol of the rotating rabbits. An ancient German riddle describes this graphic thus:

This curious graphic riddle can be found in all of the famous wooden synagogues from the period of the 17th and 18th century in the Ashknaz region (in Germany) that are on museum display in Beth Hatefutsoth Museum in Tel Aviv, the Jewish Museum Berlin and The Israel Museum in Jerusalem. They also appear in the Synagogue from Horb am Neckar (donated to the Israel Museum). The three animals adorn the wooden panels of the prayer room from Unterlimpurg near Schwäbisch Hall, which may be seen in replica in the Jewish Museum Berlin. They also are seen in a main exhibit of the Diaspora Museum in Tel Aviv. Israeli art historian Ida Uberman wrote about this house of worship: "... Here we find depictions of three kinds of animals, all organized in circles: eagles, fishes and hares. These three represent the Kabbalistic elements of the world: earth, water and fire/heavens... The fact that they are always three is important, for that number . . . is important in the Kabbalistic context".

Not only do they appear among floral and animal ornaments, but they are often in a distinguished location, directly above the Torah ark, the place where the holy scriptures repose.

They appear on headstones in Sataniv, Khmelnytsky Oblast, western Ukraine.

As an optical illusion or puzzle

The logo presents a problem in topology. It is a strange loop rendered as a puzzle.

Jurgis Baltrusaitis's 1955  includes a 1576 Dutch engraving with the puzzle given in Dutch and French around the image. This is the oldest known dated example of the motif as a puzzle, with a caption that translates as:

One recent philosophical book poses it as a problem in perception and an optical illusion—an example of contour rivalry. Each rabbit can be individually seen as correct—it is only when you try to see all three at once that you see the problem with defining the hares' ears. This is similar to "The Impossible Tribar" by Roger Penrose, originated by Oscar Reutersvärd. Compare M.C. Escher's impossible object.

Other uses and related designs

The Community of Hasloch's arms is blazoned as: Azure edged Or three hares passant in triskelion of the second, each sharing each ear with one of the others, in chief a rose argent seeded of the second, in base the same, features three hares. It is said, "The stone with the image of three hares, previously adorned the old village well, now stands beside the town hall." Hasloch is in the Main-Spessart district in the Regierungsbezirk of Lower Franconia (Unterfranken) in Bavaria, Germany.
Hares and rabbits have appeared as a representation or manifestation of various deities in many cultures, including: Hittavainen, Finnish god of Hares; Kaltes-Ekwa, Siberian goddess of the moon; Jade Rabbit, maker of medicine on the moon for the Chinese gods, depicted often with a mortar and pestle; Ometotchtli (Two Rabbits,) Aztec god of fertility, etc., who led 400 other Rabbit gods known as the Centzon Totochtin; Kalulu, Tumbuka mythology (Central African) Trickster god; and Nanabozho (Great Rabbit,) Ojibway deity, a shape-shifter and a cocreator of the world. See generally, Rabbits in the arts.
Tinners' Rabbits is the name of a Border Morris dance of many forms involving use of sticks and rotation of three, six or nine dancers.
The hare is rarely used in British armory; but "Argent, three hares playing bagpipes gules" belongs to the FitzErcald family of ancient Derbyshire. Parenthetically, in heraldry the "Coney", that is the rabbit, is more common than the hare. Three coneys appear in the crests of the families: Marton, co. Lincoln; Bassingthorpe co. Lincoln; Gillingham co. Norfolk and Cunliffe co. Lancashire.
Ushaw College (St Cuthbert's College, Ushaw) is a Roman Catholic seminary which includes "Three coneys" in its crest. This adornment is from the family coat of arms of William Allen.
The French crest of the family Pinoteau—dating from the first Baron Pinoteau (1814–1815) and which includes historian Hervé Pinoteau (former vice president of the Académie Internationale d'Héraldique)—includes three rabbits. See generally, Nobility of the First French Empire.
Other coats of arms of English and Irish families have three conies or hares.
"Three Conies Inn" was the name of a 17th-century inn, and three rabbits feeding was used as a motif on the obverse of its trade token. "The property is believed to date from at least the 17th century; the stone sundial above the former front door shows the date 1622. One of the earliest documented references to the property is an advertisement for the sale of a dwelling in the Northampton Mercury in September 1738. The 1777 Militia List also refers to the 'Thre Coneys'".
Among hunters, a collection of three hares ("a brace and a half" or tierce)—or three creatures of any kind, especially greyhounds, foxes, bucks—is called "a leash".
The cover art for alternative rock band AFI's album Decemberunderground features three hares, albeit in a different configuration.

See also

 Borromean rings
 , a similar flag with a triskelion
 
 
 
 
 , sharing of heads, body parts
 , a British superstition
 
 
 
 , a rotating palindrome meme
 , a Hungarian animated short film
 , in Scotland
 Three wise monkeys
 , triptych of wolves

References

Footnotes

Citations

Further reading
 Dunhuang Research Academy (2006). Jinshi Fan. ed. China Dunhuang. Nanjing: Jiangsu Fine Arts Publishing House. . Photography by Wu Jian, including Caves #305 and #407.
 Goepper, Roger. (1996) Alchi: Ladakh's Hidden Buddhist Sanctuary: The Sumtsek. London: Serindia Publications.  .  Photos of the three hares on Maitreya's dhoti.
 Goepper, Roger. The "Great Stupa at Alchi" in Artibus Asiae, Vol. LIII 1/2 (1993), pp. 111–43.
 Dunhuang Research Academy (2005). Wenjie Duan; Fan, Jinshi. ed. 敦煌石窟全集. 1, 再现敦煌. Hong Kong: The Commercial Press (H.K.) Ltd. .
Shackle, Eric, Eric Shackle's e-book: Three Hares Share Three Ears.

Ueckermann, Erhard: Das Hasensymbol am Dom zu Paderborn, im Kloster Hardehausen, in der Kathedralkirche St. Paulus in Münster und der Klosterkirche Haina. In: Zeitschrift für Jagdwissenschaft 41 (1995), S. 285–29.
 Tan Chung, Editor. (1994) Dunhuang Art: Through the Eyes of Duan Wenjie. New Delhi: Abhinav Publications. .
 Whitfield, Susan. (2004) The Silk Road: Trade, Travel, War and Faith. London: The British Library.  ; .

 Xizang Zizhiqu (1991) wenwu guanli weiyuanhui. Guge gucheng (The Site of the Ancient Guge Kingdom). Beijing: Wenwu chubanshe, with photos of four hares and other impossible shared-body images.

External links

Albrecht Dürer Holy Family with Three Hares (1498) Woodcut, 395 x 285 mm Staatliche Kunsthalle, Karlsruhe.
Glyph of four hares sharing four ears at Basilica of Notre-Dame de Fourvière, Lyon, France and a set of three 'wolf-hares' (or hound-rabbits) relationship by Basilius Valentinus's alchemical works and his Venus image.
Painting of three hares
Painting by Charlie Farrow of the three hares, Terri Windling benefit auction 2011
Jackie Morris water colour painter/illustrator/author and winner of the Kate Greenaway Medal and Tir na n-Og Award, Painting of three hares.
Three deer knot (sharing legs in a rotational logo)
Three hares radio program. BBC Radio.
Wikimedia commons, Hares in heraldry

6th century in the arts
Animals in Buddhism
Archaeological artifacts
Archaeological artifacts of China
Archaeology of China
Artistic techniques
Binocular rivalry
Buddhist architecture
Church architecture
Dartmoor
Ecclesiastical heraldry
Heraldic charges
Iconography
Jewish folklore
Medieval legends
Optical illusions
Ornaments (architecture)
Rabbits and hares in art
Romanesque art
Rotational symmetry
Symbols
Synagogue architecture
Tin mining
Visual motifs
Trios